Statistics of Belgian First Division in the 1910–11 season.

Overview

It was contested by 12 teams, and C.S. Brugeois won the championship.

League standings

Results

See also
1910–11 in Belgian football

References

Belgian Pro League seasons
Belgian First Division, 1913-14
1910–11 in Belgian football